The 1906 All-Ireland Senior Football Championship was the 20th year of the Gaelic football competition.
The competition was between the winners of the four provincial championships with Dublin as the All-Ireland champion for that year. In the Leinster final they ended Kildare's period as All Ireland champions.

Results

Connacht Senior Football Championship

Leinster Senior Football Championship

Munster Senior Football Championship

Ulster Senior Football Championship

All-Ireland Senior Football Championship

Because the Leinster championship was still underway when the quarter-final was to be played, Kildare was nominated to represent Leinster. When Dublin beat Kildare in the Leinster final, they were declared the champions.

Championship statistics

Miscellaneous
 For the 1st time All 5 counties played in the Connacht championship.

References

All-Ireland Senior Football Championship